John Ansell (26 March 1874 – 14 December 1948) was a British composer of light classical music.

Early life 
Born in London, he studied under Hamish MacCunn at the Guildhall School of Music and played violin and viola in various orchestras before being appointed musical director at the Playhouse Theatre in 1907.

Career 
He became music director at the Alhambra Theatre in 1913, and later worked at other theatres including the Winter Garden Theatre.  Between 1926 and 1930, he worked at the BBC as conductor of the 2LO Wireless Orchestra.

As well as incidental music, Ansell composed various popular light musical pieces, most notably the overture Plymouth Hoe, which incorporated several nautical melodies and continues to feature in the repertoire of orchestras and military bands; and another overture, The Windjammer.  He also wrote operettas, including The King's Bride (1911), and Violette (1918); and the ballet The Shoe. Ansell's obituarist in The Times commented that his music "exhibits a soundness of construction and vein of fantasy which should ensure it the regard of discriminating audiences".

Compositions
 Children's Suite
 Danses Miniatures de Ballet
 John and Sam overture
 Mediterranean Suite
 Overture to an Irish Comedy
 Plymouth Hoe, overture
 Private Ortheris overture
 Suite Pastorale
 The Shoe, ballet suite
 Three Irish Pictures
 The Windjammer overture

Death 
Ansell died in Marlow, Buckinghamshire in 1948, aged 74.

References

1874 births
1948 deaths
English musical theatre composers
English male classical composers